The Wall Street Journal is an American business-focused international daily newspaper based in New York City with international editions published in Chinese and Japanese. The Journal and its Asian editions are published six days a week by Dow Jones & Company, a division of News Corp. The newspaper is published in broadsheet format and online. The Journal has been printed continuously since its inception on July 8, 1889. The Journal is regarded as a newspaper of record, particularly in terms of business and financial news. The newspaper has won 38 Pulitzer Prizes, the most recent in 2019.

The Wall Street Journal is the second largest newspaper in the United States by circulation with a circulation of about 1.01 million in the U.S. and 2.834million globally, including nearly 1,829,000 digital sales,  compared with USA Todays 1.62million. The Journal publishes the luxury news and lifestyle magazine WSJ, which was originally launched as a quarterly but expanded to 12 issues in 2014. An online version was launched in 1995, which has been accessible only to subscribers since it began. The editorial pages of the Journal are typically conservative in their positions.

History

Founding and 19th century

The first products of Dow Jones & Company, the publisher of the Journal, were brief news bulletins, nicknamed flimsies, hand-delivered throughout the day to traders at the stock exchange in the early 1880s. They were later aggregated in a printed daily summary called the Customers' Afternoon Letter. Reporters Charles Dow, Edward Jones, and Charles Bergstresser converted this into The Wall Street Journal, which was published for the first time on July 8, 1889, and began delivery of the Dow Jones & Company News Service via telegraph.

In 1896, the Dow Jones Industrial Average was launched. It was the first of several indices of stock and bond prices on the New York Stock Exchange. In 1899, the Journal Review & Outlook column, which still runs today, appeared for the first time, initially written by Charles Dow.

20th century
Journalist Clarence Barron purchased control of the company for US$130,000 in 1902; circulation was then around 7,000 but climbed to 50,000 by the end of the 1920s. Barron and his predecessors were credited with creating an atmosphere of fearless, independent financial reporting—a novelty in the early days of business journalism. In 1921, Barron's, the United States's premier financial weekly, was founded. Barron died in 1928, a year before Black Tuesday, the stock market crash that greatly affected the Great Depression in the United States. Barron's descendants, the Bancroft family, would continue to control the company until 2007.

The Journal took its modern shape and prominence in the 1940s, a time of industrial expansion for the United States and its financial institutions in New York. Bernard Kilgore was named managing editor of the paper in 1941, and company CEO in 1945, eventually compiling a 25-year career as the head of the Journal. Kilgore was the architect of the paper's iconic front-page design, with its "What's News" digest, and its national distribution strategy, which brought the paper's circulation from 33,000 in 1941 to 1.1million when Kilgore died in 1967. Under Kilgore, in 1947, the paper won its first Pulitzer Prize for William Henry Grimes's editorials.

In 1967, Dow Jones Newswires began a major expansion outside of the United States ultimately placing its journalists in every major financial center in Europe, Asia, Latin America, Australia, and Africa. In 1970, Dow Jones bought the Ottaway newspaper chain, which at the time comprised nine dailies and three Sunday newspapers. Later, the name was changed to Dow Jones Local Media Group.

The period from 1971 to 1997 brought about a series of launches, acquisitions, and joint ventures, including "Factiva", The Wall Street Journal Asia, The Wall Street Journal Europe, the WSJ.com website, Dow Jones Indexes, MarketWatch, and "WSJ Weekend Edition". In 2007, News Corp. acquired Dow Jones. WSJ., a luxury lifestyle magazine, was launched in 2008.

A complement to the print newspaper, The Wall Street Journal Online, was launched in 1996 and has allowed access only by subscription from the beginning.

21st century
In 2003, Dow Jones began to integrate reporting of the Journal print and online subscribers together in Audit Bureau of Circulations statements. In 2007, it was commonly believed to be the largest paid-subscription news site on the Web, with 980,000 paid subscribers. Since then, digital subscription has risen to 1.3 million as of September 2018, falling to number two behind The New York Times with 3 million digital subscriptions. In May 2008, an annual subscription to the online edition of The Wall Street Journal cost $119 for those who do not have subscriptions to the print edition. By June 2013, the monthly cost for a subscription to the online edition was $22.99, or $275.88 annually, excluding introductory offers.  Digital subscription rates increased dramatically as its popularity increased over print to $443.88 per year, with first time subscribers paying $187.20 per year.

On November 30, 2004, Oasys Mobile and The Wall Street Journal released an app that would allow users to access content from The Wall Street Journal Online via their mobile phones. Pulitzer Prize–winning stories from 1995 are available free on the Pulitzer web site.

In September 2005, the Journal launched a weekend edition, delivered to all subscribers, which marked a return to Saturday publication after a lapse of some 50 years. The move was designed in part to attract more consumer advertising.

In 2005, the Journal reported a readership profile of about 60 percent top management, an average income of $191,000, an average household net worth of $2.1million, and an average age of 55.

In 2007, the Journal launched a worldwide expansion of its website to include major foreign-language editions. The paper had also shown an interest in buying the rival Financial Times.

Design changes
The nameplate is unique in having a period at the end.

Front-page advertising in the Journal was re-introduced on September 5, 2006. This followed similar introductions in the European and Asian editions in late 2005.

After presenting nearly identical front-page layouts for half a century—always six columns, with the day's top stories in the first and sixth columns, "What's News" digest in the second and third, the "A-hed" feature story in the fourth (with 'hed' being jargon for headline) and themed weekly reports in the fifth column – the paper in 2007 decreased its broadsheet width from 15 to 12inches while keeping the length at 22inches, to save newsprint costs. News design consultant Mario Garcia collaborated on the changes. Dow Jones said it would save US$18million a year in newsprint costs across all The Wall Street Journal papers. This move eliminated one column of print, pushing the "A-hed" out of its traditional location (though the paper now usually includes a quirky feature story on the right side of the front page, sandwiched among the lead stories).

The paper uses ink dot drawings called hedcuts, introduced in 1979 and originally created by Kevin Sprouls, in addition to photographs, a method of illustration considered a consistent visual signature of the paper. the Journal still heavily employs the use of caricatures, including those by illustrator Ken Fallin, such as when Peggy Noonan memorialized then-recently deceased newsman Tim Russert. The use of color photographs and graphics has become increasingly common in recent years with the addition of more "lifestyle" sections.

The daily was awarded by the Society for News Design World's Best Designed Newspaper award for 1994 and 1997.

News Corporation and News Corp
On May 2, 2007, News Corporation made an unsolicited takeover bid for Dow Jones, offering US$60 a share for stock that had been selling for US$33 a share. The Bancroft family, which controlled more than 60% of the voting stock, at first rejected the offer, but later reconsidered its position.

Three months later, on August 1, 2007, News Corporation and Dow Jones entered into a definitive merger agreement. The US$5billion sale added The Wall Street Journal to Rupert Murdoch's news empire, which already included Fox News Channel, financial network unit and London's The Times, and locally within New York, the New York Post, along with Fox flagship station WNYW (Channel 5) and MyNetworkTV flagship WWOR (Channel 9).

On December 13, 2007, shareholders representing more than 60 percent of Dow Jones's voting stock approved the company's acquisition by News Corporation.

In an editorial page column, publisher L. Gordon Crovitz said the Bancrofts and News Corporation had agreed that the Journals news and opinion sections would preserve their editorial independence from their new corporate parent:

A special committee was established to oversee the paper's editorial integrity. When the managing editor Marcus Brauchli resigned on April 22, 2008, the committee said that News Corporation had violated its agreement by not notifying the committee earlier. However, Brauchli said he believed that new owners should appoint their own editor.

A 2007 Journal article quoted charges that Murdoch had made and broken similar promises in the past. One large shareholder commented that Murdoch has long "expressed his personal, political and business biases through his newspapers and television stations". Former Times assistant editor Fred Emery remembers an incident when "Mr. Murdoch called him into his office in March 1982 and said he was considering firing Times editor Harold Evans. Mr. Emery says he reminded Mr. Murdoch of his promise that editors couldn't be fired without the independent directors' approval. 'God, you don't take all that seriously, do you?' Mr. Murdoch answered, according to Mr. Emery." Murdoch eventually forced out Evans.

In 2011, The Guardian found evidence that the Journal had artificially inflated its European sales numbers, by paying Executive Learning Partnership for purchasing 16% of European sales. These inflated sales numbers then enabled the Journal to charge similarly inflated advertising rates, as the advertisers would think that they reached more readers than they actually did. In addition, the Journal agreed to run "articles" featuring Executive Learning Partnership, presented as news, but effectively advertising. The case came to light after a Belgian Wall Street Journal employee, Gert Van Mol, informed Dow Jones CEO Les Hinton about the questionable practice. As a result, the then Wall Street Journal Europe CEO and Publisher Andrew Langhoff was fired after it was found out he personally pressured journalists into covering one of the newspaper's business partners involved in the issue. Since September 2011, all the online articles that resulted from the ethical wrongdoing carry a Wall Street Journal disclaimer informing the readers about the circumstances in which they were created.

The Journal, along with its parent Dow Jones & Company, was among the businesses News Corporation spun off in 2013 as the new News Corp.

In November 2016, in an effort to cut costs, the Journal editor-in-chief, Gerard Baker, announced layoffs of staff and consolidation of its print sections. The new "Business & Finance" section combined the former "Business & Tech" and "Money & Investing" sections. The new "Life & Arts" section took the place of "Personal Journal" and "Arena". In addition, the Journal "Greater New York" coverage was reduced and moved to the main section of paper. The section was shuttered on July 9, 2021.

In an October 2018 Simmons Research survey of 38 news organizations, The Wall Street Journal was ranked the most trusted news organization by Americans. Joshua Benton of the Nieman Journalism Lab at Harvard University wrote that the paper's "combination of respected news pages and conservative editorial pages seem to be a magic formula for generating trust across the ideological spectrum."

The Personal Journal section branding was brought back in July 2020.

From 2019 through 2022, the Journal partnered with Facebook to provide content for the social-media site's "News Tab". Facebook paid the Journal in excess of $10 million during that period, terminating the relationship as part of a broader shift away from news content.

On June 13, 2022, the Journal launched a product review website called Buy Side. The website remains free and has a distinct team from the Journal newsroom.

Recent milestones
 WSJ Noted., a monthly digital magazine, launches on June 30, 2020, in a bid to attract younger readers.
 Reaches 3 million subscribers in May 2020
WSJ Live became available on mobile devices in September 2011.
WSJ Weekend, the weekend newspaper, expanded September 2010, with two new sections: "Off Duty" and "Review".
"Greater New York", a stand-alone, full color section dedicated to the New York metro area, ran from April 2010 until July 2021.
The Wall Street Journal San Francisco Bay Area Edition, which focuses on local news and events, launched on November 5, 2009, appearing locally each Thursday in the print Journal and every day on online at WSJ.com/SF.
WSJ Weekend, formerly called Saturday's Weekend Edition: September 2005.
Launch of Today's Journal, which included both the addition of Personal Journal and color capacity to the Journal: April 2002.
Launch of The Wall Street Journal Sunday: September 12, 1999. A four-page print supplement of original investing news, market reports and personal-finance advice that ran in the business sections of other U.S. newspapers. WSJ Sunday circulation peaked in 2005 with 84 newspapers reaching nearly 11 million homes. The publication ceased on February 7, 2015.
Friday Journal, formerly called First Weekend Journal: March 20, 1998.
WSJ.com launched in April 1996.
First three-section Journal: October 1988.
First two-section Journal: June 1980.

Features and operations
Since 1980, the Journal has been published in multiple sections. At one time, the Journal page count averaged as much as 96 pages an issue, but with the industry-wide decline in advertising, the Journal in 2009–10 more typically published about 50 to 60 pages per issue.

, The Wall Street Journal had a global news staff of around 2,000 journalists in
85 news bureaus across 51 countries. , it had 26 printing plants.

Regularly scheduled sections are:

Section One: Every day; corporate news, as well as political and economic reporting and the opinion pages
Marketplace: Monday through Friday; coverage of health, technology, media, and marketing industries (the second section was launched June 23, 1980)
Money and Investing: Every day; covers and analyzes international financial markets (the third section was launched October 3, 1988)
Personal Journal: Published Tuesday through Thursday; covers personal investments, careers and cultural pursuits (the section was introduced April 9, 2002)
Off Duty: Published Saturdays in WSJ Weekend; focuses on fashion, food, design, travel and gear/tech. The section was launched September 25, 2010.
Review: Published Saturdays in WSJ Weekend; focuses on essays, commentary, reviews and ideas. The section was launched September 25, 2010.
Mansion: Published Fridays, focuses on high-end real estate. The section was launched October 5, 2012.
WSJ Magazine: Launched in 2008 as a quarterly, this luxury magazine supplement distributed within the U.S., European and Asian editions of The Wall Street Journal grew to 12 issues per year in 2014.

In addition, several columnists contribute regular features to the Journal opinion page and OpinionJournal.com:
 Weekdays: Best of the Web Today by James Freeman
 Mondays: Americas by Mary O'Grady
 Wednesdays: Business World by Holman W. Jenkins Jr.
 Thursdays: Wonder Land by Daniel Henninger
 Fridays: Potomac Watch by Kimberley Strassel
 Weekend Edition: Rule of Law, The Weekend Interview (variety of authors), Declarations by Peggy Noonan

In addition to these regular opinion pieces, on Fridays the Journal publishes a religion-themed op-ed, titled "Houses of Worship", written by a different author each week. Authors range from the Dalai Lama to cardinals.

WSJ.

WSJ. is The Wall Street Journals luxury lifestyle magazine. Its coverage spans art, fashion, entertainment, design, food, architecture, travel and more. Kristina O'Neill is Editor in Chief and Omblyne Pelier is Publisher.

Launched as a quarterly in 2008, the magazine grew to 12 issues a year for 2014. The magazine is distributed within the U.S. Weekend Edition of The Wall Street Journal newspaper (average paid print circulation is +2.2 million*), the European and Asian editions, and is available on WSJ.com. Each issue is also available throughout the month in The Wall Street Journal iPad app.

Penélope Cruz, Carmelo Anthony, Woody Allen, Scarlett Johansson, Emilia Clarke, Daft Punk, and Gisele Bündchen have all been featured on the cover.

In 2012, the magazine launched its signature platform, The Innovator Awards. An extension of the November Innovators issue, the awards ceremony, held in New York City at Museum of Modern Art, honors visionaries across the fields of design, fashion, architecture, humanitarianism, art and technology. The 2013 winners were: Alice Waters (Humanitarianism); Daft Punk (Entertainment); David Adjaye (Architecture); Do-Ho Suh (Art); Nick D'Aloisio (Technology); Pat McGrath (Fashion); Thomas Woltz (Design).

In 2013, Adweek awarded WSJ. "Hottest Lifestyle Magazine of the Year" for its annual Hot List.

U.S. circulation: Each issue of WSJ. is inserted into the weekend edition of The Wall Street Journal, whose average paid circulation for the three months ending September 30, 2013, was 2,261,772 as reported to the Alliance for Audited Media (AAM).

OpinionJournal.com

OpinionJournal.com is a website featuring content from the editorial pages of The Wall Street Journal. It existed separately from the news content at wsj.com until January 2008, when it was merged into the main website.

In addition to editorials and columns from the printed newspaper, wsj.com carries two daily web-only columns:
Best of the Web Today by James Taranto, the editor of OpinionJournal.com (no subscription required).
Political Diary edited by Holman W. Jenkins Jr and featuring John Fund (separate subscription required).

The editorials (titled "Review & Outlook") reflect The Journals conservative political editorial line, as do its regular columnists, who include Peggy Noonan, John Fund, and Daniel Henninger.

WSJ Noted.
On June 30, 2020, the Journal launched WSJ Noted., a monthly digital "news and culture" magazine for subscribers aged 18–34 years old in a bid to attract a younger audience to the Journal. The magazine has a group of some 7,000 young adults who are invited to preview content, provide feedback, and join Q&As with Noted staff.

WSJ Podcasts
The WSJ operates a podcast service (WSJ Podcasts), which deliver audio podcasts along with transcripts with several channel streams, including:
 What’s News
 Minute Briefing
 The Journal.
 Your Money Briefing
 Opinion: Potomac Watch
 WSJ’s The Future of Everything
 Tech News Briefing
 The Data Agenda (paid program)
 Bad Bets
 UBS Business Unusual (paid program)

Editorial board

The Wall Street Journal editorial board members oversee the Journal's editorial page, dictating the tone and direction of the newspaper's opinion section. The Wall Street Journal does not provide details on the exact duties of board members.

Every Saturday and Sunday, three editorial page writers and host Paul Gigot, editor of the Editorial Page, appear on Fox News Channel's Journal Editorial Report to discuss current issues with a variety of guests. As editors of the editorial page, Vermont C. Royster (served 1958–1971) and Robert L. Bartley (served 1972–2000) were especially influential in providing a conservative interpretation of the news on a daily basis.

Contrasts have been noted between the Journal's news reporting and its editorial pages. "While Journal reporters keep busy informing readers," wrote one reporter in 1982, "Journal editorial writers put forth views that often contradict the paper's best reporting and news analysis." Two summaries published in 1995 by the progressive blog Fairness and Accuracy in Reporting, and in 1996 by the Columbia Journalism Review criticized the Journal editorial page for inaccuracy during the 1980s and 1990s. One reference work in 2011 described the editorial pages as "rigidly neoconservative" while noting that the news coverage "has enjoyed a sterling reputation among readers of all political stripes".

In July 2020, more than 280 Journal journalists and Dow Jones staff members wrote a letter to new publisher Almar Latour to criticize the opinion pages' "lack of fact-checking and transparency, and its apparent disregard for evidence", adding that "opinion articles often make assertions that are contradicted by WSJ reporting." The editorial board responded that its opinion pages "won't wilt under cancel-culture pressure" and that the objective of the editorial content is to be independent of the Journals news content and offer alternative views to "the uniform progressive views that dominate nearly all of today's media." The board's response did not address issues regarding fact-checking that had been raised in the letter.

Editorial positions

Economic

During the Reagan administration, the newspaper's editorial page was particularly influential as the leading voice for supply-side economics. Under the editorship of Robert Bartley, it expounded at length on economic concepts such as the Laffer curve, and how a decrease in certain marginal tax rates and the capital gains tax could allegedly increase overall tax revenue by generating more economic activity.

In the economic argument of exchange rate regimes (one of the most divisive issues among economists), the Journal has a tendency to support fixed exchange rates over floating exchange rates.

Political

The Journal editorial pages and columns, run separately from the news pages, have a conservative bent and are highly influential in establishment conservative circles. Despite this, the Journal refrains from endorsing candidates and has not endorsed a candidate since 1928. 

The editorial board has long argued for a pro-business immigration policy.

The Journal editorial page was seen as critical of many aspects of Barack Obama's presidency. In particular, it has been a prominent critic of the Affordable Care Act legislation passed in 2010, and has featured many opinion columns attacking various aspects of the bill. The Journal editorial page has also criticized the Obama administration's energy policies and foreign policy.

On October 25, 2017, the editorial board called for Special Counsel Robert Mueller to resign from the investigation into Russian interference in the 2016 United States elections and accused Hillary Clinton's 2016 presidential campaign of colluding with Russia. In December 2017, the editorial board repeated its calls for Mueller's resignation. The editorials by the editorial board caused fractures within The Wall Street Journal, as reporters say that the editorials undermine the paper's credibility.

In October 2021, the editorial board let former President Donald Trump publish a letter in the editorial pages of the paper. The news sources described the contents of the letter as false and debunked claims about the 2020 presidential election. In response to criticism of the Journal'''s decision to publish the letter, the editorial board said the criticism was "cancel-culture pressure".

Scientific
The Journal editorial pages were described as a "forum for climate change denial" in 2011 due to columns that attacked climate scientists and accused them of engaging in fraud. A 2011 study found that the Journal was alone among major American print news media in how, mainly in its editorial pages, it adopted a false balance that overplayed the uncertainty in climate science or denied anthropogenic climate change altogether. That year, the Associated Press described the Journal's editorial pages as "a place friendly to climate change skeptics". In 2013, the editorial board and other opinion writers vocally criticized President Obama's plan to address climate change, mostly without mentioning climate science. A 2015 study found The Wall Street Journal was the newspaper that was least likely to present negative effects of global warming among several newspapers. It was also the most likely to present negative economic framing when discussing climate change mitigation policies, tending to take the stance that the cost of such policies generally outweighs their benefit.

Climate Feedback, a fact-checking website on media coverage of climate science, determined that multiple opinion articles range between "low" and "very low" in terms of scientific credibility. The Partnership for Responsible Growth stated in 2016 that 14% of the guest editorials on climate change presented the results of "mainstream climate science", while the majority did not. The Partnership also determined that none of the 201 editorials concerning climate change that were published in The Wall Street Journal since 1997 conceded that the burning of fossil fuels is the main cause of climate change.

In the 1980s and 1990s, the Journal published numerous columns opposing and misrepresenting the scientific consensus on the harms of second-hand smoke, acid rain, and ozone depletion, in addition to public policy efforts to curb pesticides and asbestos. The Journal later recognized that efforts to curb acid rain through cap-and-trade had been successful, a decade after the Clean Air Act Amendments.

Political views
Its reporting has been described as "small-c conservatism". Some of the Journal former reporters claim that the paper has adopted a more conservative tone since Rupert Murdoch's purchase.

Bias in news pages
Pre-Murdoch ownership
The Journals editors stress the independence and impartiality of their reporters. According to CNN in 2007, the Journal's "newsroom staff has a reputation for non-partisan reporting." Ben Smith of the New York Times described the Journal's news reporting as "small-c [conservative]", and noted that its readership leans further to the right than other major newspapers.

In a 2004 study, Tim Groseclose and Jeffrey Milyo argue the Journal news pages have a pro-liberal bias because they more often quote liberal think tanks. They calculated the ideological attitude of news reports in 20 media outlets by counting the frequency they cited particular think tanks and comparing that to the frequency that legislators cited the same think tanks. They found that the news reporting of the Journal was the most liberal (more liberal than NPR or The New York Times). The study did not factor in editorials. Mark Liberman criticized the model used to calculate bias in the study and argued that the model unequally affected liberals and conservatives and that "the model starts with a very peculiar assumption about the relationship between political opinion and the choice of authorities to cite." The authors assume that "think tank ideology ... only matters to liberals."

The company's planned and eventual acquisition by News Corp in 2007 led to significant media criticism and discussion
about whether the news pages would exhibit a rightward slant under Rupert Murdoch. An August 1, 2007 editorial responded to the questions by asserting that Murdoch intended to "maintain the values and integrity of the Journal".

During Trump presidency
In 2016 and 2017, the Journal leadership under Baker came under fire from critics, both from the outside and from within the newsroom, who viewed the paper's coverage of President Donald Trump as too timid. Particularly controversial was the Journals November 2016 front-page headline that repeated Trump's false claim that "millions of people" had voted illegally in the election, only noting that the statement was "without corroboration".

Also controversial was a January 2017 note from Baker to Journal editors, directing them to avoid using the phrase "seven majority-Muslim countries" when writing about Trump's executive order on travel and immigration; Baker later sent a follow-up note "clarifying that there was 'no ban'" on the phrase, "but that the publication should 'always be careful that this term is not offered as the only description of the countries covered under the ban.'"

At a town-hall-style meeting with Journal staff in February 2017, Baker defended the paper's coverage, saying that it was objective and protected the paper from being "dragged into the political process" through a dispute with the Trump administration.

A 2018 survey conducted by Gallup and the Knight Foundation found that The Wall Street Journal was considered the third most-accurate and fourth most-unbiased news organization among the general public, tenth among Democrats, and second among Republicans.

On February 19, 2020, China announced the revoking of the press credentials of three Wall Street Journal reporters based in Beijing. China accused the paper of failing to apologize for publishing articles that criticized China's efforts to fight the COVID-19 pandemic, and failing to investigate and punish those responsible.

In June 2020, following the murder of George Floyd and subsequent protests, journalists at the Journal sent a letter to editor in chief Matt Murray demanding changes to the way the paper covers race, policing and finance. The reporters stated that they "frequently meet resistance when trying to reflect the accounts and voices of workers, residents or customers, with some editors voicing heightened skepticism of those sources’ credibility compared with executives, government officials or other entities".

Notable stories and Pulitzer Prizes
The Journal has won 38 Pulitzer Prizes in its history. Staff journalists who led some of the newspaper's best-known coverage teams have later published books that summarized and extended their reporting.

1987: RJR Nabisco buyout
In 1987, a bidding war ensued between several financial firms for tobacco and food giant RJR Nabisco. Bryan Burrough and John Helyar documented the events in more than two dozen Journal articles. Burrough and Helyar later used these articles as the basis of a bestselling book, Barbarians at the Gate: The Fall of RJR Nabisco, which was turned into a film for HBO.

1988: Insider trading
In the 1980s, then-Journal reporter James B. Stewart brought national attention to the illegal practice of insider trading. He was awarded the Pulitzer Prize in explanatory journalism in 1988, which he shared with Daniel Hertzberg, who went on to serve as the paper's senior deputy managing editor before resigning in 2009. Stewart expanded on this theme in his 1991 book, Den of Thieves.

1997: AIDS treatment
David Sanford, a Page One features editor who was infected with HIV in 1982 in a bathhouse, wrote a front-page personal account of how, with the assistance of improved treatments for HIV, he went from planning his death to planning his retirement. He and six other reporters wrote about the new treatments, political and economic issues, and won the 1997 Pulitzer Prize for National Reporting about AIDS.

2000: Enron
Jonathan Weil, a reporter at the Dallas bureau of The Wall Street Journal, is credited with first breaking the story of financial abuses at Enron in September 2000. Rebecca Smith and John R. Emshwiller reported on the story regularly, and wrote a book, 24 Days. In October 2021, the Journal released Bad Bets, a podcast that recounted the papers reporting on Enron.

2001: 9/11
The Journal claims to have sent the first news report, on the Dow Jones wire, of a plane crashing into the World Trade Center on September 11, 2001. Its headquarters, at One World Financial Center, was severely damaged by the collapse of the World Trade Center just across the street. Top editors worried that they might miss publishing the first issue for the first time in the paper's 112-year history. They relocated to a makeshift office at an editor's home, while sending most of the staff to Dow Jones's South Brunswick Township, New Jersey, corporate campus, where the paper had established emergency editorial facilities soon after the 1993 World Trade Center bombing. The paper was on the stands the next day, albeit in scaled-down form. Perhaps the most compelling story in that day's edition was a first-hand account of the Twin Towers' collapse written by then-Foreign Editor John Bussey, who holed up in a ninth-floor Journal office, literally in the shadow of the towers, from where he phoned in live reports to CNBC as the towers burned. He narrowly escaped serious injury when the first tower collapsed, shattering all the windows in the Journal offices and filling them with dust and debris. The Journal won a 2002 Pulitzer Prize in Breaking News Reporting for that day's stories.

The Journal subsequently conducted a worldwide investigation of the causes and significance of 9/11, using contacts it had developed while covering business in the Arab world. In Kabul, Afghanistan, a reporter from The Wall Street Journal bought a pair of looted computers that Al Qaeda leaders had used to plan assassinations, chemical and biological attacks, and mundane daily activities. The encrypted files were decrypted and translated. It was during this coverage that terrorists kidnapped and killed Journal reporter Daniel Pearl.

2007: Stock option scandal
In 2007, the paper won the Pulitzer Prize for Public Service, with its iconic gold medal, for exposing companies that illegally backdate stock options they awarded executives to increase their value.

2008: Bear Stearns fall
Kate Kelly wrote a three-part series that detailed events that led to the collapse of Bear Stearns.

2010: McDonald's health care
A report published on September 30, 2010, detailing allegations McDonald's had plans to drop health coverage for hourly employees drew criticism from McDonald's as well as the Obama administration. The Wall Street Journal reported the plan to drop coverage stemmed from new health care requirements under the Patient Protection and Affordable Care Act. McDonald's called the report "speculative and misleading", stating they had no plans to drop coverage. The Wall Street Journal report and subsequent rebuttal received coverage from several other media outlets.

2015: Malaysia Prime Minister Najib Razak and 1MDB
In 2015, a report published by The Journal alleged that up to US$700 million was wired from 1MDB, a Malaysian state investment company, to the personal accounts of Malaysia Prime Minister Najib Razak at AmBank, the fifth largest lender in Malaysia. Razak responded by threatening to sue the New York-based newspaper. The Journal's reporting on the 1MDB scandal was a finalist for the 2016 Pulitzer Prize in international reporting.

The report prompted some governmental agencies in Malaysia to conduct an investigation into the allegation. On July 28, 2020, Najib Razak was found guilty on seven charges in the 1MDB scandal. He was sentenced to 12 years in prison.

2015–present: Theranos investigation
In 2015, a report written by the Journal John Carreyrou alleged that blood testing company Theranos' technology was faulty and founder Elizabeth Holmes was misleading investors. According to Vanity Fair, "a damning report published in The Wall Street Journal had alleged that the company was, in effect, a sham—that its vaunted core technology was actually faulty and that Theranos administered almost all of its blood tests using competitors' equipment." The Journal has subsequently published several more reports questioning Theranos' and Holmes' credibility. In May 2018, Carreyrou released a book about Theranos, Bad Blood, which met with critical success (and was compared to Stewart's Den of Thieves). The following month, the U.S. Attorney for the Northern District of California announced the indictment of Holmes on wire fraud and conspiracy charges in relation to her role as CEO of Theranos. Holmes was found guilty on four of the eleven original charges in January 2022.

Rupert Murdoch—at the time a major investor in Theranos and owner of the Journal—lost approximately $100 million in his investments in Theranos.

2018–present: Investigation into Stormy Daniels payment
On January 12, 2018, Michael Rothfeld and Joe Palazzolo reported in The Wall Street Journal that during the 2016 presidential campaign, then-candidate Donald Trump's personal lawyer, Michael Cohen coordinated a $130,000 payment to Stormy Daniels for her silence regarding an alleged affair. In subsequent reports, the method of payment and many other details were extensively covered. In April of that year, FBI agents stormed Cohen's home, seizing records related to the transaction. On August 21, 2018, Cohen pleaded guilty to eight counts including campaign finance violations in connection with the Daniels payment. The coverage earned the Journal the 2019 Pulitzer Prize for National Reporting.
See also

 William Peter Hamilton
 The Economic Times Far Eastern Economic Review Index of Economic Freedom – an annual report published by the Journal together with The Heritage Foundation
 Lucky duckies
 Media in New York City
 On the Money (2013 TV series) – the current title of a CNBC-produced program known as The Wall Street Journal Report from 1970 until the CNBC/Dow Jones split in January 2013.The Wall Street Journal Special Editions Wall Street Journal Radio Network
 Worth Bingham Prize
 Billion dollar whale 

References

Further reading

 Douai, Aziz, and Terry Wu. "News as business: the global financial crisis and Occupy movement in the Wall Street Journal". Journal of International Communication 20.2 (2014): 148–167.
 Merrill, John C., and Harold A. Fisher. The world's great dailies: profiles of fifty newspapers (1980), pp. 338–41.
 Rosenberg, Jerry M. Inside The Wall Street Journal: The History and the Power of Dow Jones & Company and America's Most Influential Newspaper (1982) online
 Sakurai, Takuya. "Framing a Trade Policy: An Analysis of The Wall Street Journal Coverage of Super 301". Intercultural Communication Studies 24.3 (2015). online
 Steinbock, Dan. "Building dynamic capabilities: The Wall Street Journal interactive edition: A successful online subscription model (1993–2000)". International Journal on Media Management 2.3-4 (2000): 178–194.
 Yarrow, Andrew L. "The big postwar story: Abundance and the rise of economic journalism". Journalism History 32.2 (2006): 58+ online 

External links

 The Wall Street Journal blogs 
OpinionJournal website (redirector)
Opinion & Commentary section of the WSJ website
Political Diary (paid subscription required)
Money Rates including Prime Rate
The Wall Street Journal editorial board
"It all began in the basement of a candy story", by Cynthia Crossen, The Wall Street Journal'', July 31, 2007
The Pioneer of Wall Street: John J. Kiernan at Irish America

 
1889 establishments in New York (state)
Articles containing video clips
Business newspapers published in the United States
Daily newspapers published in New York City
Dow Jones & Company
Financial data vendors
National newspapers published in the United States
Newspapers established in 1889
Financial services companies established in 1889
Pulitzer Prize-winning newspapers
Pulitzer Prize for Public Service winners
Pulitzer Prize for National Reporting winners
Pulitzer Prize for International Reporting winners
Pulitzer Prize for Explanatory Journalism winners
Podcasting companies